Ning Legaspi Cabagnot, complete name Phoebe Clarice Legaspi Cabagnot (born 6 October 1978), is a Filipina politician and an incumbent Sangguniang Panlalawigan Member (Provincial Board Member) of the Western District of the Province of Aklan, Philippines.

Advocacy
Ning's main legislative priorities are: Poverty Reduction, Education, Energy, Food Security, Health and Eco-Tourism. She supports Gawad Kalinga as Sponsor for Poor Children for more than 6 years and the Philippine Red Cross (Donations and Helping out Typhoon Ondoy and Pablo victims).

In Aklan, she supports STAC-Kalibo (Stimulation and Therapeutic Activity Center) by promoting increased awareness of the needs of special children. She also donates funds to the center so that the latter will be able to help special children uplift their condition through therapy and specialized educational learning methods. Ning celebrated her birthday with the children of STAC in 2010.

Early life

Coming from an Aklanon family with a long line of politicians, Ning was born to father Frenz Gomez Cabagnot, a businessman, and mother Atty. Corazon "Nining" Tumbokon Legaspi-Cabagnot, a former Governor of Aklan and Vice-Consul of Guam. Ning's maternal grandfather is Dr. Jose Baltazar Legaspi, a former Governor and Congressman of Aklan and married to Rafaelina Concepcion Tumbokon (National Board of Examiners, Pharmacy). Ning's maternal great-grandfather is Dr. Rafael Silva Tumbokon, former Assemblyman of Capiz and Undersecretary of Health. He was married to a teacher, Pilar Mijares Concepcion.

Ning Legaspi Cabagnot spent most of her younger years overseas because her mother, former Governor Corazon L. Cabagnot, was a diplomat in Guam. Most of her early years of childhood and elementary were spent at Sta. Barbara School in Guam except for a short stint at St. Mary's College in Quezon City. Her family finally went back to the Philippines for good in 1988 and she continued her studies at St. Joseph's College for elementary. She, along with her other siblings, then had to move again to Aklan since her mother was already the Governor at that time in 1989. She then continued the remaining two years of elementary at the Kalibo Pilot Elementary School under the special section or the highest section for grades 5 and 6.

Education

High school
After elementary, Ning Cabagnot qualified for a star section seat at the Science Development High School of Aklan (now called the Regional Science High School for Region VI). She spent her first two years of high school in SDHSA and then transferred to Saint Joseph's College in Quezon City where she graduated in high school.

University
Not long after she left Aklan, Ning was reunited again with some of her friends and classmates who, like her, got accepted to the Premier State University – the University of the Philippines in Diliman. She completed her Bachelor of Arts Degree in Communication Research in the year 1999. She was a consistent honors/top ten student in both elementary and high school.

While at UP Diliman, Ning was active in championing and supporting the cause of various students' clubs and organizations.

Private career
As a fresh graduate of UP Diliman in 1999, Ning worked at various multi-national companies in the private sector. She has worked extensively as an IT Project Manager in a variety of global and regional projects whose clients are based in Europe, the US, Central America, Japan and Singapore. Her global experience also attests to her being based for projects in Singapore, Japan and the United States of America (USA).

Political career

Provincial Board Member Achievements

Ning's achievements as Member of the Aklan Provincial Board from July 2010 to December 2012 include:
 141 Projects Supported for both Eastern and Western Districts of Aklan
 More than 1,730 Poor Patients Helped Financially for both Eastern and Western Districts of Aklan
 41 Resolutions Authored/Co-Authored. Among others, Resolution No. 2011 – 056 – Resolution Directing the Committee on Human Resources and Committee on Appropriations, Budget and Finance To Conduct An Investigation, In Aid of Legislation, The Non-Remittances of at Least 1,700,000.00 pesos in Contributions of Provincial Capitol Employees to the Government Service Insurance System (GSIS) As Supported By Republic Act No. 8291 (GSIS Act of 1997)
 5 Ordinances Authored/Co-Authored

Committee Leadership and Participation

Bid for Congress
Ning Legaspi Cabagnot is running as Representative of the Lone District of Aklan.

References

1978 births
Living people
Independent politicians in the Philippines
People from Aklan
People from Quezon City
University of the Philippines Diliman alumni
21st-century Filipino women politicians
21st-century Filipino politicians